The Palta were an indigenous people of Ecuador. They once spoke the unclassified and scarcely attested Palta language.

References 

Indigenous peoples in Ecuador
Indigenous peoples of the Amazon